Robert Andrzej Ruszkowski (June 9, 1942 – July 16, 1998) was a Polish sprint canoer who competed in the mid-1960s. He was eliminated in the semifinals of the K-4 1000 m at the 1964 Summer Olympics in Tokyo. He was born in Warsaw.

References
 Robert Ruszkowski's profile at Sports Reference.com
 Robert Ruszkowski's profile at the Polish Olympic Committee 

1942 births
1998 deaths
Canoeists at the 1964 Summer Olympics
Olympic canoeists of Poland
Polish male canoeists
Sportspeople from Warsaw